Bellino is a surname. Notable people with the surname include:

Dan Bellino (born 1978), American baseball umpire
Joe Bellino (1938–2019), American football player
Joe Bellino (politician) (born 1958), American politician
Paolo Bellino (born 1969), Italian hurdler
Pietro Bellino (died 1641), Italian Roman Catholic bishop